Rudolf II, Duke of Saxe-Wittenberg, nicknamed Rudolf the Blind, ( – 6 December 1370 in Wittenberg) was a member of the House of Ascania. He was Elector of Saxony and Duke of Saxe-Wittenberg from 1356 until his death. He was the eldest son of Duke Rudolf I of Saxe-Wittenberg and his wife, Judith of Brandenburg-Salzwedel.

Life 
Rudolf II acted in the diplomatic service of his father from an early age.

On 25 August 1345, he fought on the side of King Philip VI of France in the Battle of Crécy.  After King John of Bohemia died, Rudolf II took over the leadership of the German auxiliary troops.  Although the French lost the battle, Philip VI thanked Rudolf II and gave him a bloody thorn that was said to have been part of the Crown of Thorns.  In those days, relics were deeply venerated and such a gift was very valuable.  It was even valuable economically, as the place where such a relic was kept, drew large numbers of pilgrims, providing a steady stream of revenue.  His father and stepmother had built a basilica chapel in the All Saints' Church in Wittenberg.  Due to the acquisition of the relic, this chapel evolved into the seat of a provost.  After his father's death, Rudolf II reaffirmed the Church's rights and expanded its possessions.

When Rudolf I felt he was too old to travel to the Imperial Diet, he gave Rudolf II the power to represent him at the Diet.  After Rudolf I died on 12 March 1356, Rudolf II asked the imperial court in Metz on 27 December 1356 to reaffirm the rights of the Saxe-Wittenberg line of the House of Ascania, against opposing claims from the Saxe-Lauenburg line.

Rudolf II continued his father's policies.  Like his father, he had to deal with claims on the Saxon electoral vote by the Saxe-Lauenburg line, and on the County of Brehna by the Margraves of Meissen of the House of Wettin, which had once held Brehna.  When the Wettins also began to question his rights to Herzberg, Prettin, Trebnitz, Klöden, Pretzsch, Schmiedeberg and other possessions, he had to respond militarily.  This conflict and other political activities drained his financial resources.  In 1359, he sold the city of Allstedt to Gebhard XIV of Querfurt and exchanged Gatterslaben Castle with Archbishop Dietrich of Magdeburg for Wiesenburg Castle and Schweinitz.

Territorial acquisitions 
In 1360, he acquire the Lordship of LIebenwerda, which bounded his territory on the east side.  In 1370, he acquired the County of Barby with Walternien Castle, which he gave to the Barby family as a fief.

In 1369, William II, the last Prince of Lüneburg died and Emperor Charles IV ruled that the Principality of Lüneburg was a completed fief and awarded it to Albert, who was a grandson of William II via his mother and a nephew of Rudolf II via his father.  Duke Magnus II Torquatus of Brunswick-Wolfenbüttel disagreed with this outcome, which led to the Lüneburg War of Succession, which lasted long after Rudolf II's death.

Domestic policies 
A major theme of his domestic political activities was his endeavour to secure his revenues.  For example, he gave the city of Herzberg the right to mine salt and protected the salt route via Halle and Bitterfeld to Torgau.  In order to combat robber barons, he outlawed such practices and concluded alliances with other cities.  In 1358, during his reign, he destroyed Ließnitz castle, a den of robbers on the site where the city of Kropstädt would later be built.  He arbitrated in a dispute between the Castle Church and the City Church of Wittenberg.

From 1370, he styled himself Elector of Saxony, a title he had been granted by the Golden Bull of 1356.
Towards the end of his life, he almost completely lost his eyesight, which earned him the nickname Rudolf the Blind.

Death 
Rudolf II died on 6 December 1370.  As he had no sons or male-line grandsons, he was succeeded by his younger brother, Wenceslas I.

During excavations at the site of a former Franciscan monastery in Wittenberg in 2009, Rudolf's grave was discovered by archaeologists. He had been buried in a wooden coffin, next to his wife and daughter. His sword and his lead seal had been put in his grave.

Marriage and issue 
Before 8 May 1336, Rudolf II married Elisabeth (d. 30 May 1373, buried at Wittenberg Franciscan monastery), the daughter of Landgrave Otto of Hesse. They had one daughter:
 Elisabeth (d. young 1353, buried at Wittenberg Franciscan Monastery).

Sources (including German Wikipedia) named a second marriage with Elisabeth (d. 15 November 1373), the daughter of Count Ulrich II of Lindow-Ruppin, and the existence of a son, Albert, who died soon after birth in 1371. However, this seems unlikely, because the findings at Wittenberg monastery on 2009 showed that Rudolf II was buried with his Hessian wife (presumably the only one because no trace of other grave from another consort was found) and one daughter (who also discarted the existence of a second daughter born from the "first" marriage, Beate, who died ca. 1373).

Ancestors

See also 
 House of Ascania

References 

 Paul Braun: Von der Wittenberger Stiftskirche, in: Blätter für Heimatgeschichte. Beilage der Wittenberger Zeitung, January 1929
 Georg Hirschfeld: Geschichte der Sächsisch-Askanischen Kurfürsten, Verlag Sittenfeld, Berlin, 1884
 Friedrich Israel: Das Wittenberger Universitätsarchiv. Seine Geschichte und seine Bestände, Gebauer-Schwetschke Verlag, Halle (Saale), 1913
 Heinrich Kühne: Die Askanier. Aus der Geschichte der sächsisch-askanischen Herzöge und Kurfürsten von Sachsen-Wittenberg, Drei-Kastanien-Verlag, Wittenberg, 1999, 
 Helga Wäß: Form und Wahrnehmung mitteldeutscher Gedächtnisskulptur im 14. Jahrhundert. Ein Beitrag zu mittelalterlichen Grabmonumenten, Epitaphen und Kuriosa in Sachsen, Sachsen-Anhalt, Thüringen, Nord-Hessen, Ost-Westfalen und Südniedersachsen, Edition Tenea, Berlin, 2006,  (two volumes; also thesis, University of Göttingen, 2001)
 Katalog ausgewählter Objekte vom Hohen Mittelalter bis zum Anfang des 15. Jahrhunderts (zur Deckplatte der Doppeltumba Rudolfs II. und seiner Gemahlin Elisabeth, p. 603 - 607.

External links 

 Article about the excavation of his grave

Prince-electors of Saxony
Dukes of Saxe-Wittenberg
House of Ascania
1300s births
1370 deaths